Neomordellistena flavopila is a beetle in the genus Neomordellistena of the family Mordellidae. It was described in 1967 by Ermisch.

References

flavopila
Beetles described in 1967